Blue Hours is the fifth studio album by British folk rock band Bear's Den. It was released on 13 May 2022 by Communion in the United Kingdom and internationally. The album was written by the band and produced by Ian Grimble. It marked the bands' first record of new material since So That You Might Hear Me in 2019 and follows the collaboration album with Paul Frith, Fragments. The album debuted on the UK Albums Chart at number 6, making it the bands' joint most successful album domestically.

Recording 
The album builds on the themes of the bands previous releases, with greater emphasis on self-reflection and mental health after both band members struggled particularly with the latter in the years leading up to the albums' recording. It also marked a move towards a sound containing more electronic experimentation whilst still retaining acoustic and piano use throughout.

Critical reception 
The album was released to mainly positive reviews with many focusing on the personal and intimate nature of the album's lyrics.

Writing in her review for Pitchfork, Hannah Jocelyn spoke of how the Blue Hours''' production was contrasting to its themes, stating, "every song sounds clean and punchy, but the refined atmosphere is at odds with the band's newfound comfort with messiness." In her 6 out of 10 review for Gigwise, Leeza Isaeva also concentrated on the emotional focus of the songs throughout. In praising Davie's lyrics which "excel with some moments of emotional complexity" there was criticism of the limited development of the bands' sound as they "continue to combine their banjo sound with limited electronic experimentation." Adam Boustred, writing for Renowned for Sound also scored the album 6 out of 10 but praised the production, commenting it "underlines the album's character in its timbre".

 Commercial performance Blue Hours debuted at number 6 in the UK, making it the bands' joint highest position on the chart alongside their second album, Red Earth & Pouring Rain''. The album also charted in The Netherlands & Belgium.

Chart performance

Track listing 
All tracks written by Bear's Den (Andrew Davie & Kevin Jones) and produced by Ian Grimble.

References 

2022 albums
Folk rock albums